laut.de is a German online magazine dealing exclusively with entertainment music, especially pop music, rock music, alternative, metal, hip-hop, jazz and techno. It comprises record reviews, interviews, biographies of important artists, music-related news, as well as concert reports and recommendations. Fourteen music journalists and programmers work with laut.de.

Laut.de was founded in 1998 by Seitenbau GmbH in Konstanz. Today, it is owned by Laut AG. The founder and chairman of the magazine is Rainer Henze.

On 10 June 2005, laut.de launched the Internet radio laut.fm with an exclusive live recording of the song "Radio brennt" by German punk rock band Die Ärzte. From December 2006 there was also a daily podcast. At the Popkomm 2007, music video platform laut.tv was presented.

Laut.de had 2.5 million visits per month as of October 2006. The website reached over 500,000 individual readers through August 2018.

Recognitions and awards 
laut.de was the winner of the 2002 online editorial category prize of the Landesanstalt für Kommunikation Baden-Württemberg. The Department of Germanic Languages and Literatures at the University of Michigan ranked it first on its list of recommended online music magazines, praising its wide-ranging coverage. In November 2011, Tonight.de also acclaimed the broad coverage of laut.de.

References

External links
Official website

German music websites
Online music magazines published in Germany
Online music and lyrics databases
Magazines established in 1998